Michael Tommy Hodges (29 July 1932 – 17 December 2022) was a British screenwriter, film and television director, playwright and novelist. His films as writer/director include Get Carter (1971), Pulp (1972), The Terminal Man (1974) and Black Rainbow (1989). He co-wrote and was the original director on Damien: Omen II. As director, his films include Flash Gordon (1980) and Croupier (1998).

Early life 
Hodges was born in Bristol on 29 July 1932, and was raised in Salisbury and Bath. He qualified as a chartered accountant and spent two years of national service on the lower deck of a Royal Navy minesweeper.

Career  
Hodges found a job in British television as a teleprompter operator. The job allowed him to observe the workings of the studios, and gave him time to start writing scripts. One of these scripts was Some Will Cry Murder, written for ABC's Armchair Theatre series. Although never performed, it served to get him enough writing commissions to quit his job as a technician.

After that, he quickly progressed to producer/director status, with series such as Sunday Break for ABC Television, World in Action for Granada Television and the arts programmes Tempo and New Tempo for Thames Television. He wrote, directed and produced two filmed thrillers, Suspect (1969) and Rumour (1970), again for Thames Television. These films formed the basis for the creation of Euston Films, the influential television production company that continued into the 1980s. These two films also led to Hodges being asked to write and direct Get Carter (1971), which has been described as "one of the great British gangster films of all time." Hodges worked with Carter star Michael Caine again in Pulp (1972), before proceeding to make films such as the Michael Crichton adaptation The Terminal Man (1974) and the space opera Flash Gordon (1980). Some of Hodges' later films include A Prayer for the Dying (1987), Croupier (1998) and I'll Sleep When I'm Dead (2003).

Interspersed with his cinema work are some critically successful television films, including The Manipulators (1973), Squaring The Circle (1984; scripted by Tom Stoppard), Dandelion Dead (1994; scripted by Michael Chaplin), and The Healer (1994; scripted by G. F. Newman). Hodges also collaborated on the English language version of Federico Fellini's And the Ship Sails On (1983).

He wrote and narrated the biographical documentary All At Sea in post production 2022.

Theatre and radio 
His theatre plays included Soft Shoe Shuffle (1985) and Shooting Stars and Other Heavenly Pursuits (2000), which was adapted for BBC radio. Other radio plays included King Trash (2004). His first novel, Watching The Wheels Come Off, was published first in French by Rivagse/Noir (Quand Tout Se Fait La Malle) in 2009 then in English in 2010. In 2018 his trio of novellas ('Bait', 'Grist' & 'Security') was published by Unbound.

Personal life and death
Hodges was married twice. His first marriage was to Jean Alexandrov; they had two sons and later divorced. He then married Carol Laws. 

Hodges died from heart failure at his home in Dorset on 17 December 2022, at the age of 90.

Recognition 
Retrospectives of his work in television and cinema have included the NFT (London) in  1980; MOMA (New York) in 1990; American Cinematheque (LA) in 1990; and Munich (Germany) in 1999. He was awarded the degree of 'Doctor of Letters" by the University of the West of England, Bristol in 2005.

Selected filmography

Feature films

Television 
The Tyrant King (1968)
Rumour (1969)
Suspect (1970)
The Manipulators (1972)
Missing Pieces (1982)
Squaring the Circle (1984)
W.G.O.D. (1985)
Florida Straits (1986)
Dandelion Dead (1994)
The Healer (1994)
Murder by Numbers (2001 – documentary)

References

Further reading
 Steven Paul Davies: Get Carter And Beyond: The Cinema of Mike Hodges, Batsford, 2003, 
 Douglas Keesey: Neo-Noir: Contemporary Film Noir From Chinatown to The Dark Knight Kamera Books, 2010, 
 Steve Chibnall & Robert Murphy: British Crime Cinema, Routledge, 1999, 
 Steve Chibnall: Get Carter (British Film Guides #6), I.B. Tauris, 2003, 
 Geoff Mayer: Guide to British Cinema (Reference Guides to the World's Cinema) Greenwood Press, 2003 
 Interview with Mike Hodges
 Interview with Mike Hodges 2000
 The Telegraph, Film-makers on film-Mike Hodges 2004
 The National: Get Carter turns 40
 Interview with Mike Hodges 2010
 The Michael Klinger Papers; Interview with Mike Hodges by Tony Klinger and Andrew Spicer

External links
 
 
 
 Interview at The Guardian
 Interview by Dan Lybarger

1932 births
2022 deaths
20th-century Royal Navy personnel
British film directors
British male screenwriters
British television directors
Deaths from congestive heart failure
Film people from Bristol
Science fiction film directors